Ronnie Baker (born October 15, 1993) is an American professional track and field athlete specializing in the sprints. Over 60 meters his personal best time of 6.40 seconds makes him the third-fastest man in the event in history. He was champion over 60 m at the USA Indoor Championships in 2017, a medalist over 60 m at the World Indoor Championships in 2018, and a gold medallist in the  relay at the World Relays in 2017. Baker was a dominant competitor over 100 m in the Diamond League circuit in 2018, winning four races and placing no worse than second, including in the final where he also placed second. He was the fastest man in the world in 2017 over 60 m, and the second fastest in 2018 over both 60 m and 100 m. In college he competed for the TCU Horned Frogs, where he was champion over 60 m at the NCAA Division I Indoor Championships in both 2015 and 2016. At the 2020 Tokyo Olympics, Ronnie Baker ran the personal best of 9.83 in the men's 100m semi-finals, which made him the 6th fastest man in the history of Olympics 100m event.

Early life
When Baker first started with school he ran cross country. Once in middle school he switched to running the 400 meters, and stuck with that through high school, competing in both track and basketball at Ballard High School in Louisville, Kentucky. Baker looked up to and was influenced by Michael Johnson, Tyson Gay, and Usain Bolt during his running career.

Track career
Baker ran for the Texas Christian University (TCU) track team, switching from the 400 meters to the shorter sprint events. During his time there he was twice NCAA (United States collegiate) champion in the 60 m event in 2015 and 2016.

In 2017, Baker became national indoor champion over 60 m. A month later at the World Relays he earned his first gold medal at a global championship in the 4 × 100 m relay.

In 2018, Baker won third in the World Indoor Championships.

He set his 100 m then-personal best (9.87, wind −0.1 m/s) on August 22, 2018 at the Kamila Skolimowska Memorial in Chorzów.

In his first 100 m race of 2021 at the Texas Relays on March 27, Baker won in a world leading 9.94 s and also broke the 1992 meet record of 9.97 s set by Olapade Adeniken.

He qualified for the Tokyo Olympics by running, at the time, a personal best of 9.85 in the 100m, while finishing 2nd at the 2020 US Olympic Trials.

Baker's Tokyo Olympic semifinal personal best time of 9.83 makes him the 6th fastest man and ties him for the 9th fastest time in Olympic 100m history; it also qualifies him as the third-fastest American in Olympic 100m history.

Accolades and awards
While in high school, Baker was named in 2011 and 2012 the Gatorade state boys track and field athlete of the year. He received enough powdered Gatorade that he and his mother were able to stock Ballard High with the product for a time.

Personal life
A native of Louisville, Kentucky, Baker attended Ballard High School. He also lived in Anchorage, Alaska for seven years in his youth. Baker is a distant relative of Tyson Gay. He married the former Mikaela Harrison on March 7, 2020, in Fort Worth, Texas.

Statistics
Information from World Athletics profile unless otherwise noted.

Personal bests

International championship results

Circuit wins
Diamond League (100 m)
Eugene: 2017, 2018
Rome: 2018
Paris: 2018
London: 2018
Stockholm: 2021
Monaco: 2021
World Athletics Indoor Tour (60 m)
Overall winner: 2020
Toruń: 2017
Birmingham: 2017
Glasgow: 2020
Liévin: 2020
Madrid: 2020

National championship results

NCAA results from Track & Field Results Reporting System.

Seasonal bests

See also
 2018 in 100 metres

References

External links

 Ronnie Baker's profile at Performance Kitchen Crafted

Ronnie Baker bio at TCU Horned Frogs

Videos
Ronnie Baker wins the Prefontaine Classic men's 100 meters in a wind-assisted 9.78 seconds via IAAF Diamond League on YouTube
Tokyo 100m final preview? Baker, Simbine, Bromell, battle to wire in Monaco via IAAF Diamond League on YouTube

1993 births
Living people
African-American male track and field athletes
American male sprinters
Ballard High School (Louisville, Kentucky) alumni
Sportspeople from Louisville, Kentucky
Track and field athletes from Kentucky
Sportspeople from Anchorage, Alaska
Track and field athletes from Alaska
TCU Horned Frogs men's track and field athletes
World Athletics Indoor Championships medalists
USA Indoor Track and Field Championships winners
Competitors at the 2015 Summer Universiade
Athletes (track and field) at the 2020 Summer Olympics
Olympic track and field athletes of the United States
Olympic male sprinters
21st-century African-American sportspeople